Anonno Mamun is a Bangladeshi film director and screenwriter. His works include Most Welcome, Ami Shudhu Cheyechi Tomay, Ostitto, Ami Tomar Hote Chai, Nabab LLB, Makeup, Koshai and Amanush.

Career
Anonno Mamun started his career in 2000 as a script writer for Tollywood films. He had written several high-profile films in Bangladesh film industry. In 2010 he directed his first film Wanted, followed by his second directorial project Most Welcome in 2012. Then he directed Ami Shudhu Cheyechi Tomay in 2014 which was the first co-production film between Bangladesh and India.

In 2015 two film released Blackmail (2015 film) and Valobashar Golpo.

In 2016 Arifin Shuvoo and Nusrat Imrose Tisha starrer Ostitto released.
He has begun shooting Ami Tomar Hote Chai starring Bappy Chowdhury and Bidya Sinha Saha Mim which is expected to release in 2016.

In December 2020, the first part of his fictional courtroom drama Nabab LLB, was released on Bangladeshi streaming services. The unfavourable depiction of the Bangladeshi police force handling the case of a sexual assault victim in the movie led to Mamun's arrest on 25 December 2020, along with the actor who portrayed the police, Shaheen Mridha.

Filmography

Web series

Controversy
He was arrested in Malaysia for smuggling 57 people under the pretext of a cultural event. He was later released.

References

External links
 
 

Bengali film directors
Bengali screenwriters
Living people
Year of birth missing (living people)